Horseshoe bats are bats in the family Rhinolophidae, which is in the superfamily Rhinolophoidea. All extant horseshoe bats are in the genus Rhinolophus. There is one extinct genus of horseshoe bats, Palaeonycteris. As of 2019, there were 106 described species in Rhinolophus, making it the second-most speciose genus of bat after Myotis.

Conventions

Conservation statuses listed for each species follow the International Union for Conservation of Nature (IUCN) Red List of Threatened Species.  The  symbol indicates that the species's population trend is positive, the  symbol indicates that the species's population trend is negative, the  symbol indicates that the species's population is stable, and the  symbol indicates that the species's population trend is unknown.  Population trends are based on the Red List of Threatened Species. The super-scripted "IUCN" tag is a link to that species's Red List of Threatened Species page. If a species has taxonomic synonyms, a list of these is provided in the "Scientific name" column, underneath the binomial name and author. If a species has subspecies, a list of these is provided in the "Common name" column, underneath the common name.

Palaeonycteris
 Palaeonycteris robustus: known only from fossils.

Rhinolophus
Rhinolophus can be informally divided into two clades: the predominantly African clade and the predominantly Oriental clade.

African clade

Subgenus Rhinolophus

Oriental clade

Subgenus Aquias

Subgenus Phyllorhina

Subgenus Indorhinolophus

Subgenus Coelophyllus

Subgenus Rhinophyllotis
{| class="wikitable" width="100%"
| colspan="5" align="center" bgcolor="lightblue"|Subgenus Rhinophyllotis – 3 species groups, 31 species
|-
| colspan="5" align="center" bgcolor="#F2F2CE"|Species group R. megaphyllus – 12 species 

|-
| colspan="5" align="center" bgcolor="#F2F2CE"|Species group R. philippinensis – 7 species 

|-
| colspan="5" align="center" bgcolor="#F2F2CE"|Species group R. pusillus – 12 species 
{|class="wikitable sortable" style="width:100%;text-align:center"
!scope="col" class="unsortable"|Common name
!scope="col" class="unsortable"|Scientific name
!scope="col" class="unsortable"|IUCN Red List Status
!scope="col" class="unsortable"|Range
!scope="col" class="unsortable"|Picture
|-
!scope="row"|Acuminate horseshoe bat(Accuminate horseshoe bat) 
|R. acuminatus Peters, 1871 
| 
|
|
|-
!scope="row"|Andaman horseshoe bat
|R. cognatusK. Andersen, 1906  
| 
|
|–
|-
!scope="row"|Convex horseshoe bat
|R. convexusCsorba, 1997
| 
|
|–
|-
!scope="row"|Little Japanese horseshoe bat{{Collapsible list|title=Subspecies:{{efn|R. c. cornutus on the main islands of Japan; R. c. pumilus on Okinawa; R. c. miyakonis on Miyako-jima; R. c. orii' on Amami Ōshima and Tokunoshima.}}|R. c. cornutus Temminck, 1834R. c. pumilus K. Andersen, 1905R. c. miyakonis Kuroda, 1924R. c. orii Kuroda, 1924}}
|R. cornutusTemminck, 1834  
|
|In Japan and possibly in China
|
|-
!scope="row"|Imaizumi's horseshoe bat
|R. imaizumiiHill & Yoshiyuki, 1980  
|
|On Ishigaki-jima, Japan
|–
|-
!scope="row"|Yaeyama little horseshoe bat
|R. perditusK. Andersen, 1918  
| 
|On Iriomote Island, Japan
|–
|-
!scope="row"|Blyth's horseshoe bat
|R. lepidusBlyth, 1844  
| 
|
|
|-
!scope="row"|Formosan lesser horseshoe bat 
|R. monocerosK. Andersen, 1905  
|
|Endemic to Taiwan
|–
|-
!scope="row"|Osgood's horseshoe bat
|R. osgoodiSanborn, 1939  
| 
|
|–
|-
!scope="row"|Least horseshoe bat
|R. pusillusTemminck, 1834  
| 
|
|
|-
!scope="row"|Shortridge's horseshoe bat
|R. shortridgeiK. Andersen, 1918   
| 
|
|–
|-
!scope="row"|Little Nepalese horseshoe bat
|R. subbadiusBlyth, 1844   
| 
|
|–
|-
|}
|}

Incertae sedis
Several taxa are of uncertain placement, or incertae sedis''

Notes

References

Bibliography

 

bats, horseshoe
Rhinolophidae